Veronica bellidioides is a flowering plant species in the genus Veronica of the family Plantaginaceae. It is native to Europe. This species was described by Carl von Linné.

References

bellidioides
Flora of Europe